SNS College of Technology is one among the premiere institutes in Coimbatore, Tamil Nadu, India. It was established in 2002 as part of the SNS Groups. The college is approved by AICTE and affiliated to the Anna University, Coimbatore. Anna University, Chennai confirmed the conferment of Autonomous status to SNS College of Technology for a period of 10 years with effect from 2018–19 to 2027–28. SNS College of Technology is Accredited by 'NAAC' with the highest A+ Grade and SNS had started to follow a new education strategy called design thinking which has 5 elements.

SNS College of Technology was founded in 2002 and has been administered and run by Sri. SNS Charitable Trust. The institution was established with the permission of the Government of Tamil Nadu and recognized by UGC. It is a self-financing, co-educational, college and performs its academic duties with a motto of Sincerity, Nobility and Service (SNS). The college is located in a rural area on Sathy (NH-209) road at Coimbatore.

It offers fourteen undergraduate courses, six postgraduate courses and seven research programmes. Four departments of the college namely Mech., CSE, ECE & IT are accredited by the National Board of Accreditation (NBA).

Undergraduate degree courses (B.E./B.Tech.) 
 Aerospace Engineering
 Aeronautical Engineering (Lateral)
 Agricultural Engineering 	
 Automobile Engineering
Artificial Intelligence and Machine Learning	
 Bio-Medical Engineering
 Civil Engineering
 Computer Science and Engineering
 Electrical & Electronics Engineering
 Electronics and Communication Engineering 
 Electronics and Instrumentation Engineering
 Mechatronics engineering
 Information Technology
 Mechanical Engineering
 Computer science and technology

Postgraduate courses 
 Master of Business Administration (MBA)
 Master of Computer Applications (MCA)
 M.E. Computer Science and Engineering
 M.E. Communication Systems
 M.Tech. Information Technology
 M.E. VLSI

Research Programme (Ph.D.) 
 Mechanical Engineering
 Information Technology
 Electronics and Communication Engineering
 Electrical and Electronics Engineering
 Computer Science Engineering
 Civil Engineering
 Business Administration.

External links
 SNS College of Technology
 VIMZER - EEE Association of SNS College of Technology
 Facebook group - created by students

Engineering colleges in Coimbatore